Íngrid Martz de la Vega (Mexico City, 17 September 1979) is a Mexican actress and model.

Biography 
Martz studied acting at El Centro de Capacitación Artística de Televisa (CEA). She appeared in La que no podía amar, a telenovela, as Daniella, Ana Paula's best friend and Miguel's wife.

Some of her credited works include Luz Clarita (1996), María Isabel (1997), Preciosa (1998), Salud, dinero y amor (1997), Mujeres engañadas (1999), Carita de ángel (2000), El derecho de nacer (2001), El juego de la vida (2001), Amor real (2003) and Amarte es mi Pecado (2004).

Besides acting in telenovelas, she has also starred in music videos and movies.

In 2004 she acted alongside Bárbara Mori in the hit telenovela, Rubí.

Filmography

Theater
Busco al hombre de mi vida, marido ya tuve
Chicas Católicas

Awards and nominations

Premios TVyNovelas

References

External links

Ingrid Martz at the Esmas

1979 births
Living people
Mexican telenovela actresses
Mexican television actresses
Mexican film actresses
Mexican stage actresses
Mexican female models
20th-century Mexican actresses
21st-century Mexican actresses
Actresses from Mexico City
Mexican people of German descent
People from Mexico City